Wilfried Erdmann (born 15 April 1940 in Czarnikau, Posen Province, Prussia) is a German sailor and author. He is known for his single-handed, non-stop circumnavigations.

Biography  
Erdmann was born in Posen Province, Prussia but grew up in Karstädt in East Germany. After finishing school he worked as a carpenter before relocating to West Germany at the age of 17. From 1958 to 1959 he traveled alone to India by bicycle via Southern France, North Africa, the Near East and Afghanistan. It was in India that he first encountered the idea of sailing across the oceans. Because he couldn't afford a boat he made his living for a couple of years as a seaman in the Merchant navy.

In 1967 Erdmann embarked on his first circumnavigation. In Alicante, Spain, where he bought his first boat, a used 25 ft wooden ship, he met Bernard Moitessier, who also introduced him to the art of astronavigation. Erdmann renamed the boat Kathena and arrived on 7 May 1968 after 421 days in Helgoland. He was the first German sailor who sailed across the world alone. Because of the size of his boat, nobody in Germany believed him first. Erdmann was able to give proof of the visited ports of call, though.

1969 to 1972 he spent his honeymoon with his wife Astrid on a 1011-day long journey, which eventually became his second circumnavigation. Having sold Kathena, his first boat, they traveled with his second boat Kathena 2.

 1976 to 1979: journey to the South Pacific with his wife and his 3-year-old son Kym.
 1984 to 1985: non-stop, solo circumnavigation from west to east with the prevailing winds with Kathena Nui in 271 days.
 1989: two Atlantic crossings with winners of a contest of German magazine Stern.
 2000 to 2001: non-stop, solo circumnavigation from east to west (contrary to the prevailing winds) with Kathena Nui in 343 days. He was the fifth sailor worldwide doing such a journey.

References 
  CV on his homepage (German)
  Article about his circumnavigation (German)

External links 
 Homepage of Wilfried Erdmann 

1940 births
Living people
German sailors
People from Czarnków
Single-handed circumnavigating sailors